Benjámin Cseke (born 22 July 1994) is a Hungarian football player who plays for DVTK, on loan from Mezőkövesd.

Career

MTK Budapest
On 30 August 2019 it was confirmed, that Cseke had returned to MTK Budapest FC on loan with an option to buy from Paksi FC until the summer 2020. MTK announced on 21 January 2020, that the club had triggered the option and signed a long-term deal with the club.

Club statistics

Updated to games played as of 15 May 2021.

References

External links
 
 

1994 births
Living people
Footballers from Budapest
Hungarian footballers
Hungary youth international footballers
Hungary under-21 international footballers
Association football midfielders
Vasas SC players
MTK Budapest FC players
Újpest FC players
Paksi FC players
Mezőkövesdi SE footballers
Diósgyőri VTK players
Nemzeti Bajnokság I players
Nemzeti Bajnokság II players